The Branch River is a river in the Marlborough Region of New Zealand. Just before flowing into the Wairau, the Branch River crosses underneath State Highway 63.

In 1978 a power station was considered for the Branch River and was commissioned in 1983, being completed in 1984. It is Marlborough Region's largest source of electricity generation.

See also
List of rivers of New Zealand

References

Rivers of the Marlborough Region
Rivers of New Zealand